Ralph Milton Winge (August 25, 1925 - June 12, 2020), was an American politician who was a member of the North Dakota House of Representatives. He represented the 24th district from 1959 to 1968 and from 1971 to 1978 as a member of the Democratic party. An alumnus of the North Dakota State University (B.Sc. Agricultural Economics), he was a farmer.

References

1925 births
2020 deaths
North Dakota Democrats
North Dakota State University alumni